Crossminton, previously known as Speed Badminton, is a racket game that combines elements from different sports like badminton, squash and tennis. It is played without any net and has no prescribed playground, so it can be executed on tennis courts, streets, beaches, fields or gyms.

The sport is often associated with the brand Speedminton because of their historical relation. From 1 January 2016 the name of the racket sport has been changed from Speed Badminton to Crossminton. Today, Crossminton is played all around the world. Currently, there are tournaments all over the world which are organized in a growing number of clubs. On August 25, 2011 the International Crossminton Organization (ICO) was founded under the name International Speed Badminton Organisation (ISBO) in Berlin. By 2018 the ICO already had 26 members - national federations from Europe, America, Asia and Africa.

History 

The special shuttlecock and the idea of the game were invented in 2001 in Berlin by Bill Brandes. The game was refined to the final game of crossminton by the Speedminton company. The inventor first named his new sport "shuttleball", but soon the game was renamed "speed badminton". Starting from January 2016 the name was changed again, to crossminton. Originally, the idea of the inventor was to create an outdoor variant of badminton, so he changed the ball to be smaller and heavier (today called speeder). The analogy of badminton now exists only in a technical way: there is no net and the game tempo is faster. In 2003, there were already 6,000 active players in Germany. The sport is growing steadily and there are numerous international tournaments across Europe.

Game

Court 
The court consists of two squares of 5.50 m (18 ft) length. They are fixed opposite to each other at a distance of 12.8 m (42 ft).

Equipment 

Both of the players need a racket. The rackets are similar to the ones used in squash but are specially produced for Crossminton. They are 58–60 cm long, and the material and the strings are different. The ball is called a speeder and is heavier than a conventional badminton shuttlecock, meaning it can be used up to wind force 4.

Rules 

The field consists of two squares measuring 5.5 meters (18 ft) on each side. The distance between the squares is 12.8 meters (42 ft). Crossminton can be played on half of a tennis court which can easily be modified with elastic lines. Match Speeders are used for normal games. Children and adolescents (U12) play with fun speeders on a smaller court (4x4 m) over a smaller distance (9 meters). 

The aim of the game is to reach the square of the opposite player with the speeder. If the speeder falls outside the opposite square, the other side gains a point. Both players are allowed to step out of, or anywhere inside their square during play.

The game ends when one player has at least 16 points and has at least 2 points advantage over their opponent. Every time a set/round finishes, the players switch sides.

Match 
A game ends when one player reaches 16 points. If the score is tied at 15 or greater, play continues until one player has a two-point advantage. A match usually consists of two winning sets (best of three).

Service 
The right to serve first is drawn by throwing a coin or a speeder. Every player has three serves. Every rally scores. At a score of 15:15 the serve switches after every point. The serve must be done out of the designated zone which is 3 m behind the front offensive line. This line must not be crossed and the serve is played bottom-up. The first serve of the next set is done by the loser of the previous set.

Points 
Every rally scores if there is no necessity to repeat it. Points can be gained if:
 the serve is not correct
 the speeder touches the floor or the roof
 the speeder lands in the opposite court and cannot be returned
 the speeder lands outside the court (the lines count as being within the court)
 the speeder is touched two times immediately after each other
 the speeder touches the body

If a player returns a speeder from outside the court, it is considered to still be in play.

Change of ends 
After every set, there is a change of ends to guarantee equal opportunities concerning wind and lighting conditions. If a third game (tiebreak) becomes necessary, players change sides after every 6 points.

Variants 
 Doubles : The doubles match is played on a single court.
At the double division, both players are standing in the same court. The coin or speeder decides the side who serves first. The serving player stands at the backline, and their partner stands in front. The serves rotate between the four players. The first serve in the following set goes to the loser of the previous one.

 Black lighting : Crossminton can be played by night with fluorescent equipment and black light.
Crossminton can be played outside and inside, the court can be painted or pegged off. There is even the possibility to use a portable court. Crossminton played in the dark is called Blackminton. With black lights, fluorescent paints, rackets and special speeders (night speeders) with glow sticks (speedlights) it is possible to play even at night.

World & European Championships 
The first Crossminton (former Speed Badminton) World Championships took place on 26 and 27 August 2011. It was officially named ‘ISBO Azimut Hotels Speedminton® World Championships’. Over 380 participants from 29 countries played in Berlin, in 10 categories. Players from Canada, the US and Australia also attended. Per Hjalmarson from Sweden won the men’s title, Janet Köhler from Germany won the women’s title and Rene Lewicki & Daniel Gossen from Germany won the doubles title in the final games. Since then the World and European Championships alternate every year.

International tournaments 
There are many international crossminton tournaments taking place all around the world under the supervision of the International Crossminton Organization. Every member country can host up to one 1000/500 points tournament and four 250 points tournaments every year. There are only five 1000 points tournaments every year, chosen by the ICO based on the applications sent by member federations. The series of 1000 and 500 points tournaments is called World Series.

By participating in international ICO tournaments the players receive ranking points based on their results. Ranking points are used to determine seeding for upcoming tournaments.

* 1000 points tournaments are denoted in bold characters

Nations Cup 
Since 2013 the ICO has organized a national team competition called ICO Nations Cup. The concept is derived from tennis competitions like David Cup or Fed Cup, but in crossminton mixed teams consisting of both male and female players are competing. First, Regional tournaments are played in group- or elimination system and then the winners of Regional tournaments – Regional Champions – battle it out for the title of ICO Nations Cup Champion at the Final tournament.

A national team consists of at least three players – 2 male players (open category, but not as a rule) and 1 female player (women’s category, but not as a rule) – and not more than five players (3 players + 2 reserves that can step in for either singles or doubles matches). A clash between two national teams consists of 6 matches – 4 singles and 2 doubles matches.

References

External links 

Crossminton - International Site about the new racket sport.
Speedminton - Site of the producer Speedminton with videos, photos and all information about the new sport.
ISBO / ICO– Site of the International Crossminton Organisation
Speedminton Gekkos Berlin e.V. - Site of the first official Speed Badminton/Crossminton club in Berlin; with photos and advice. 
SbK Lipany - Speed Badminton Club Lipany. 
Crossminton.sk - Crossminton site in Slovakia. 
Speed Badminton in Canada - Site of the first official Speed Badminton club in Canada.
Speedminton Blackminton PORTUGAL - Portuguese site with photos, videos, events, online store and much information.
German Speed Badminton Association / German Speed Badminton Association - The German Crossminton Association 
SC "Crossminton Bulgaria" - site of the first crossminton club in Bulgaria]
Česká asociace crossmintonu - official site of the Czech Association of Crossminton. (in Czech)

Individual sports
Racket sports
Badminton
Games and sports introduced in 2001
Sports originating in Germany